Harriet Tubman (born Araminta Ross,  – March 10, 1913) was an American abolitionist and social activist. Born into chattel slavery, Tubman escaped and subsequently made some 13 missions to rescue approximately 70 similarly-enslaved people, including her family and friends, using the network of antislavery activists and safe houses known as the Underground Railroad. During the American Civil War, she served as an armed scout and spy for the Union Army. In her later years, Tubman was an activist in the movement for women's suffrage.

Born into slavery in Dorchester County, Maryland, Tubman was beaten and whipped by various slaveholders as a child. Early in life, she suffered a traumatic head wound when an irate enslaver threw a heavy metal weight, intending to hit another enslaved person, but hit her instead. The injury caused dizziness, pain, and spells of hypersomnia, which occurred throughout her life. After her injury, Tubman began experiencing strange visions and vivid dreams, which she ascribed to premonitions from God. These experiences, combined with her Methodist upbringing, led her to become devoutly religious.

In 1849, Tubman escaped to Philadelphia, only to return to Maryland to rescue her family soon after. Slowly, one group at a time, she brought relatives with her out of the state, and eventually guided dozens of other enslaved people to freedom. Traveling by night and in extreme secrecy, Tubman (or "Moses", as she was called) "never lost a passenger". After the Fugitive Slave Act of 1850 was passed, she helped guide escapees farther north into British North America (Canada), and helped newly freed people find work. Tubman met John Brown in 1858, and helped him plan and recruit supporters for his 1859 raid on Harpers Ferry.

When the Civil War began, Tubman worked for the Union Army, first as a cook and nurse, and then as an armed scout and spy. The first woman to lead an armed expedition in the war, she guided the raid at Combahee Ferry, which liberated more than 700 enslaved people. After the war, she retired to the family home on property she had purchased in 1859 in Auburn, New York, where she cared for her aging parents. She was active in the women's suffrage movement until illness overtook her, and she had to be admitted to a home for elderly African Americans that she had helped to establish years earlier. She became an icon of courage and freedom.

Birth and family 

Tubman was born Araminta "Minty" Ross to enslaved parents, Harriet ("Rit") Green and Ben Ross. Rit was enslaved by Mary Pattison Brodess (and later her son Edward). Ben was enslaved by Anthony Thompson, who became Mary Brodess's second husband, and who ran a large plantation near the Blackwater River in the Madison area of Dorchester County, Maryland.

As with many enslaved people in the United States, neither the exact year nor place of Tubman's birth is known, and historians differ as to the best estimate. Kate Larson records the year as 1822, based on a midwife payment and several other historical documents, including her runaway advertisement, while Jean Humez says "the best current evidence suggests that Tubman was born in 1820, but it might have been a year or two later". Catherine Clinton notes that Tubman reported the year of her birth as 1825, while her death certificate lists 1815 and her gravestone lists 1820.

Tubman's maternal grandmother, Modesty, arrived in the U.S. on a slave ship from Africa; no information is available about her other ancestors. As a child, Tubman was told that she seemed like an Ashanti person because of her character traits, though no evidence has been found to confirm or deny this lineage. Her mother, Rit (who may have had a white father), was a cook for the Brodess family. Her father, Ben, was a skilled woodsman who managed the timber work on Thompson's plantation. They married around 1808 and, according to court records, had nine children together: Linah, Mariah Ritty, Soph, Robert, Minty (Harriet), Ben, Rachel, Henry, and Moses.

Rit struggled to keep her family together as slavery threatened to tear it apart. Edward Brodess sold three of her daughters (Linah, Mariah Ritty, and Soph), separating them from the family forever. When a trader from Georgia approached Brodess about buying Rit's youngest son, Moses, she hid him for a month, aided by other enslaved people and freedmen in the community. At one point she confronted her enslaver about the sale. Finally, Brodess and "the Georgia man" came toward the slave quarters to seize the child, where Rit told them, "You are after my son; but the first man that comes into my house, I will split his head open." Brodess backed away and abandoned the sale. Tubman's biographers agree that stories told about this event within the family influenced her belief in the possibilities of resistance.

Childhood 

Tubman's mother was assigned to "the big house" and had scarce time for her own family; consequently, as a child Tubman took care of a younger brother and baby, as was typical in large families. When she was five or six years old, Brodess hired her out as a nursemaid to a woman named "Miss Susan". Tubman was ordered to care for the baby and rock the cradle as it slept; when the baby woke up and cried, she was whipped. She later recounted a particular day when she was lashed five times before breakfast. She carried the scars for the rest of her life. She found ways to resist, such as running away for five days, wearing layers of clothing as protection against beatings, and fighting back.

As a child, Tubman also worked at the home of a planter named James Cook. She had to check the muskrat traps in nearby marshes, even after contracting measles. She became so ill that Cook sent her back to Brodess, where her mother nursed her back to health. Brodess then hired her out again. She spoke later of her acute childhood homesickness, comparing herself to "the boy on the Swanee River", an allusion to Stephen Foster's song "Old Folks at Home". As she grew older and stronger, she was assigned to field and forest work, driving oxen, plowing, and hauling logs.

As an adolescent, Tubman suffered a severe head injury when an overseer threw a  metal weight at another enslaved person who was attempting to flee. The weight struck Tubman instead, which she said: "broke my skull". Bleeding and unconscious, she was returned to her enslaver's house and laid on the seat of a loom, where she remained without medical care for two days. After this incident, Tubman frequently experienced extremely painful headaches. She also began having seizures and would seemingly fall unconscious, although she claimed to be aware of her surroundings while appearing to be asleep. Larson suggests she may have had temporal lobe epilepsy as a result of the injury; Clinton suggests her condition may have been narcolepsy or cataplexy. A definitive diagnosis is not possible due to lack of contemporary medical evidence, but this condition remained with her for the rest of her life.

After her injury, Tubman began experiencing visions and vivid dreams, which she interpreted as revelations from God. These spiritual experiences had a profound effect on Tubman's personality and she acquired a passionate faith in God. Although Tubman was illiterate, she was told Bible stories by her mother and likely attended a Methodist church with her family. She rejected the teachings of white preachers who urged enslaved people to be passive and obedient victims to those who trafficked and enslaved them; instead she found guidance in the Old Testament tales of deliverance. This religious perspective informed her actions throughout her life.

Family and marriage 
Anthony Thompson promised to manumit Tubman's father at age 45. After Thompson died, his son followed through with that promise in 1840. Tubman's father continued working as a timber estimator and foreman for the Thompson family. Several years later, Tubman contacted a white attorney and paid him five dollars to investigate her mother's legal status. The lawyer discovered that a former enslaver had issued instructions that Tubman's mother, Rit, like her husband, would be manumitted at age 45. The record showed that a similar provision would apply to Rit's children, and that any children born after she reached 45 years of age were legally free, but the Pattison and Brodess families ignored this stipulation when they inherited the enslaved family. Challenging it legally was an impossible task for Tubman.

Around 1844, she married a free black man named John Tubman. Although little is known about him or their time together, the union was complicated because of her enslaved status. The mother's status dictated that of children, and any children born to Harriet and John would be enslaved. Such blended marriages – free people of color marrying enslaved people – were not uncommon on the Eastern Shore of Maryland, where by this time, half the black population was free. Most African-American families had both free and enslaved members. Larson suggests that they might have planned to buy Tubman's freedom.

Tubman changed her name from Araminta to Harriet soon after her marriage, though the exact timing is unclear. Larson suggests this happened right after the wedding, and Clinton suggests that it coincided with Tubman's plans to escape from slavery. She adopted her mother's name, possibly as part of a religious conversion, or to honor another relative.

Escape from slavery 

In 1849, Tubman became ill again, which diminished her value in the eyes of the slave traders. Edward Brodess tried to sell her, but could not find a buyer. Angry at him for trying to sell her and for continuing to enslave her relatives, Tubman began to pray for her owner, asking God to make him change his ways. She said later: "I prayed all night long for my master till the first of March; and all the time he was bringing people to look at me, and trying to sell me." When it appeared as though a sale was being concluded, "I changed my prayer", she said. "First of March I began to pray, 'Oh Lord, if you ain't never going to change that man's heart, kill him, Lord, and take him out of the way'." A week later, Brodess died, and Tubman expressed regret for her earlier sentiments.

As in many estate settlements, Brodess's death increased the likelihood that Tubman would be sold and her family broken apart. His widow, Eliza, began working to sell the family's enslaved people. Tubman refused to wait for the Brodess family to decide her fate, despite her husband's efforts to dissuade her. "[T]here was one of two things I had a right to", she explained later, "liberty or death; if I could not have one, I would have the other".

Tubman and her brothers, Ben and Henry, escaped from slavery on September 17, 1849. Tubman had been hired out to Anthony Thompson (the son of her father's former owner), who owned a large plantation in an area called Poplar Neck in neighboring Caroline County; it is likely her brothers labored for Thompson as well. Because the enslaved were hired out to another household, Eliza Brodess probably did not recognize their absence as an escape attempt for some time. Two weeks later, she posted a runaway notice in the Cambridge Democrat, offering a reward of up to $100 each for their capture and return to slavery. Once they had left, Tubman's brothers had second thoughts. Ben may have just become a father. The two men went back, forcing Tubman to return with them.

Soon afterward, Tubman escaped again, this time without her brothers. Before leaving she sang a farewell song to hint at her intentions, which she hoped would be understood by Mary, a trusted fellow enslaved woman: "I'll meet you in the morning", she intoned, "I'm bound for the promised land." While her exact route is unknown, Tubman made use of the network known as the Underground Railroad. This informal system was composed of free and enslaved black people, white abolitionists, and other activists. Most prominent among the latter in Maryland at the time were Quakers (members of the Religious Society of Friends). The Preston area near Poplar Neck contained a substantial Quaker community and was probably an important first stop during Tubman's escape. From there, she probably took a common route for people fleeing slavery – northeast along the Choptank River, through Delaware, and then north into Pennsylvania.

Tubman had to travel by night, guided by the North Star and trying to avoid slave catchers eager to collect rewards for escapees. The "conductors" in the Underground Railroad used deceptions for protection. At an early stop, the lady of the house instructed Tubman to sweep the yard so as to seem to be working for the family. When night fell, the family hid her in a cart and took her to the next friendly house. Given her familiarity with the woods and marshes of the region, Tubman likely hid in these locales during the day. The particulars of her first journey are unknown; because other escapees from slavery used the routes, Tubman did not discuss them until later in life. She crossed into Pennsylvania with a feeling of relief and awe, and recalled the experience years later:

Nicknamed "Moses" 

After reaching Philadelphia, Tubman thought of her family. "I was a stranger in a strange land," she said later. "[M]y father, my mother, my brothers, and sisters, and friends were [in Maryland]. But I was free, and they should be free." She worked odd jobs and saved money. The U.S. Congress meanwhile passed the Fugitive Slave Law of 1850, which heavily punished abetting escape and forced law enforcement officials – even in states that had outlawed slavery – to assist in their capture. The law increased risks for those who had escaped slavery, more of whom therefore sought refuge in Southern Ontario (then part of the United Province of Canada) which, as part of the British Empire, had abolished slavery. Racial tensions were also increasing in Philadelphia as waves of poor Irish immigrants competed with free blacks for work.

In December 1850, Tubman was warned that her niece Kessiah and her two children, six-year-old James Alfred, and baby Araminta, would soon be sold in Cambridge. Tubman went to Baltimore, where her brother-in-law Tom Tubman hid her until the sale. Kessiah's husband, a free black man named John Bowley, made the winning bid for his wife. Then, while the auctioneer stepped away to have lunch, John, Kessiah and their children escaped to a nearby safe house. When night fell, Bowley sailed the family on a log canoe  to Baltimore, where they met with Tubman, who brought the family to Philadelphia.

Early next year she returned to Maryland to help guide away other family members. During her second trip, she recovered her brother Moses and two unidentified men. Tubman likely worked with abolitionist Thomas Garrett, a Quaker working in Wilmington, Delaware. Word of her exploits had encouraged her family, and biographers agree that with each trip to Maryland, she became more confident.

In late 1851, Tubman returned to Dorchester County for the first time since her escape, this time to find her husband John. She saved money from various jobs, purchased a suit for him, and made her way south. Meanwhile, John had married another woman named Caroline. Tubman sent word that he should join her, but he insisted that he was happy where he was. Tubman at first prepared to storm their house and make a scene, but then decided he was not worth the trouble. Suppressing her anger, she found some enslaved people who wanted to escape and led them to Philadelphia. John and Caroline raised a family together, until he was killed 16 years later in a roadside argument with a white man named Robert Vincent.

Because the Fugitive Slave Law had made the northern United States a more dangerous place for those escaping slavery to remain, many escapees began migrating to Southern Ontario. In December 1851, Tubman guided an unidentified group of 11 escapees, possibly including the Bowleys and several others she had helped rescue earlier, northward. There is evidence to suggest that Tubman and her group stopped at the home of abolitionist and formerly enslaved Frederick Douglass. In his third autobiography, Douglass wrote: "On one occasion I had eleven fugitives at the same time under my roof, and it was necessary for them to remain with me until I could collect sufficient money to get them on to Canada. It was the largest number I ever had at any one time, and I had some difficulty in providing so many with food and shelter. ... " The number of travelers and the time of the visit make it likely that this was Tubman's group.

Douglass and Tubman admired one another greatly as they both struggled against slavery. When an early biography of Tubman was being prepared in 1868, Douglass wrote a letter to honor her. He compared his own efforts with hers, writing:

From 1851 to 1862, Tubman lived in St. Catharines, Ontario, a major terminus of the Underground Railroad and center of abolitionist work. Refugees from the United States were told by Tubman and other conductors to make their way to St. Catharines, once they had crossed the border, and go to the Salem Chapel (earlier known as Bethel Chapel). There, community members would help them settle into a new life in Canada.

Over 11 years, Tubman returned repeatedly to the Eastern Shore of Maryland, rescuing some 70 escapees in about 13 expeditions, including her other brothers, Henry, Ben, and Robert, their wives and some of their children. She also provided specific instructions to 50 to 60 additional enslaved people who escaped to the north. Because of her efforts, she was nicknamed "Moses", alluding to the prophet in the Book of Exodus who led the Hebrews to freedom from Egypt. One of her last missions into Maryland was to retrieve her aging parents. Her father, Ben, had purchased Rit, her mother, in 1855 from Eliza Brodess for $20. But even when they were both free, the area became hostile to their presence. Two years later, Tubman received word that her father was at risk of arrest for harboring a group of eight people escaping slavery. She traveled to the Eastern Shore and led them north to St. Catharines, Ontario, where a community of former enslaved people (including Tubman's brothers, other relatives, and many friends) had gathered.

Routes and methods 
Tubman's dangerous work required tremendous ingenuity; she usually worked during winter months, to minimize the likelihood that the group would be seen. One admirer of Tubman said: "She always came in the winter, when the nights are long and dark, and people who have homes stay in them." Once she had made contact with those escaping slavery, they left town on Saturday evenings, since newspapers would not print runaway notices until Monday morning.

Her journeys into the land of slavery put her at tremendous risk, and she used a variety of subterfuges to avoid detection. Tubman once disguised herself with a bonnet and carried two live chickens to give the appearance of running errands. Suddenly finding herself walking toward a former enslaver in Dorchester County, she yanked the strings holding the birds' legs, and their agitation allowed her to avoid eye contact. Later she recognized a fellow train passenger as another former enslaver; she snatched a nearby newspaper and pretended to read. Tubman was known to be illiterate, and the man ignored her.

While being interviewed by author Wilbur Siebert in 1897, Tubman named some of the people who helped her and places that she stayed along the Underground Railroad. She stayed with Sam Green, a free black minister living in East New Market, Maryland; she also hid near her parents' home at Poplar Neck. She would travel from there northeast to Sandtown and Willow Grove, Delaware, and to the Camden area where free black agents, William and Nat Brinkley and Abraham Gibbs, guided her north past Dover, Smyrna, and Blackbird, where other agents would take her across the Chesapeake and Delaware Canal to New Castle and Wilmington. In Wilmington, Quaker Thomas Garrett would secure transportation to William Still's office or the homes of other Underground Railroad operators in the greater Philadelphia area. Still is credited with aiding hundreds of freedom seekers escape to safer places farther north in New York, New England, and present-day Southern Ontario.

Tubman's religious faith was another important resource as she ventured repeatedly into Maryland. The visions from her childhood head injury continued, and she saw them as divine premonitions. She spoke of "consulting with God", and trusted that He would keep her safe. Thomas Garrett once said of her, "I never met with any person of any color who had more confidence in the voice of God, as spoken direct to her soul." Her faith in the divine also provided immediate assistance. She used spirituals as coded messages, warning fellow travelers of danger or to signal a clear path. She sang versions of "Go Down Moses" and changed the lyrics to indicate that it was either safe or too dangerous to proceed. As she led escapees across the border, she would call out, "Glory to God and Jesus, too. One more soul is safe!"

She carried a revolver, and was not afraid to use it: The gun afforded protection from the ever-present slave catchers and their dogs. Tubman also purportedly threatened to shoot any escaped person traveling with her who tried to turn back on the journey since that would threaten the safety of the remaining group. Tubman told the tale of one man who insisted he was going to go back to the plantation when morale got low among a group of escapees. She pointed the gun at his head and said, "You go on or die." Several days later, the man who had initially wavered, safely crossed into Canada with the rest of the group.

Those who were enslaving people in the region, meanwhile, never knew that "Minty", the petite, disabled woman who had run away years before and never came back, was responsible for freeing so many of the enslaved captives in the community. By the late 1850s, they began to suspect a northern white abolitionist was secretly enticing away the people they had enslaved. Such a high reward would have garnered national attention, especially at a time when a small farm could be purchased for a mere  and the federal government offered $25,000 for the capture of each of John Wilkes Booth's co-conspirators in President Lincoln's assassination in 1865. A reward offering of $12,000 has also been claimed, though no documentation has been found for either figure. Catherine Clinton suggests that the $40,000 figure may have been a combined total of the various bounties offered around the region.

Despite the efforts of the slavers, Tubman and the fugitives she assisted were never captured. Years later, she told an audience:
 "I was conductor of the Underground Railroad for eight years, and I can say what most conductors can't say – I never ran my train off the track and I never lost a passenger."

John Brown and Harpers Ferry 

In April 1858, Tubman was introduced to the abolitionist John Brown, an insurgent who advocated the use of violence to destroy slavery in the United States. Although she never advocated violence against whites, she agreed with his course of direct action and supported his goals. Like Tubman, he spoke of being called by God, and trusted the divine to protect him from the wrath of slavers. She, meanwhile, claimed to have had a prophetic vision of meeting Brown before their encounter.

Thus, as he began recruiting supporters for an attack on the slavers trafficking people in the region, Brown was joined by "General Tubman", as he called her. Her knowledge of support networks and resources in the border states of Pennsylvania, Maryland and Delaware was invaluable to Brown and his planners. Although other abolitionists like Douglass did not endorse his tactics, Brown dreamed of fighting to create a new state for those freed from slavery, and made preparations for military action. He believed that after he began the first battle, the enslaved would rise up and carry out a rebellion across the slave states. He asked Tubman to gather the formerly enslaved then living in present-day Southern Ontario who might be willing to join his fighting force, which she did.

On May 8, 1858, Brown held a meeting in Chatham, Ontario, where he unveiled his plan for a raid on Harpers Ferry, Virginia. When word of the plan was leaked to the government, Brown put the scheme on hold and began raising funds for its eventual resumption. Tubman aided him in this effort and with more detailed plans for the assault.

Tubman was busy during this time, giving talks to abolitionist audiences and tending to her relatives. In late 1859, as Brown and his men prepared to launch the attack, Tubman could not be contacted. When the raid on Harpers Ferry took place on October 16, Tubman was not present. Some historians believe she was in New York at the time, ill with fever related to her childhood head injury. Others propose she may have been recruiting more escapees in Ontario, and Kate Clifford Larson suggests she may have been in Maryland, recruiting for Brown's raid or attempting to rescue more family members. Larson also notes that Tubman may have begun sharing Frederick Douglass's doubts about the viability of the plan.

The raid failed; Brown was convicted of treason, murder, and inciting a rebellion, and he was hanged on December 2. His actions were seen by many abolitionists as a symbol of proud resistance, carried out by a noble martyr. Tubman herself was effusive with praise. She later told a friend: "[H]e done more in dying, than 100 men would in living."

Auburn and Margaret 
The city was a hotbed of antislavery activism, and Tubman took the opportunity to move her parents from Canada back to the U.S. Returning to the U.S. meant that those who had escaped enslavement were at risk of being returned to the South and re-enslaved under the Fugitive Slave Law, and Tubman's siblings expressed reservations. Catherine Clinton suggests that anger over the 1857 Dred Scott decision may have prompted Tubman to return to the U.S. Her land in Auburn became a haven for Tubman's family and friends. For years, she took in relatives and boarders, offering a safe place for black Americans seeking a better life in the north.

Shortly after acquiring the Auburn property, Tubman went back to Maryland and returned with her "niece", an eight-year-old light-skinned black girl named Margaret. There is great confusion about the identity of Margaret's parents, although Tubman indicated they were free blacks. The girl left behind a twin brother and both parents in Maryland. Years later, Margaret's daughter Alice called Tubman's actions selfish, saying, "she had taken the child from a sheltered good home to a place where there was nobody to care for her". Alice described it as a "kidnapping".

However, both Clinton and Larson present the possibility that Margaret was in fact Tubman's daughter. Larson points out that the two shared an unusually strong bond, and argues that Tubman – knowing the pain of a child separated from her mother – would never have intentionally caused a free family to be split apart. Clinton presents evidence of strong physical similarities, which Alice herself acknowledged. Both historians agree that no concrete evidence has been found for such a possibility, and the mystery of Tubman's relationship with young Margaret remains to this day.

In November 1860, Tubman conducted her last rescue mission. Throughout the 1850s, Tubman had been unable to effect the escape of her sister Rachel, and Rachel's two children Ben and Angerine. She had no money, so the children remained enslaved. Their fates remain unknown. Never one to waste a trip, Tubman gathered another group, including the Ennalls family, ready and willing to take the risks of the journey north. It took them weeks to get away safely because of slave catchers forcing them to hide out longer than expected. The weather was unseasonably cold and they had little food. The children were drugged with paregoric to keep them quiet while slave patrols rode by. They safely reached the home of David and Martha Wright in Auburn on December 28, 1860.

American Civil War 

When the Civil War broke out in 1861, Tubman saw a Union victory as a key step toward the abolition of slavery. General Benjamin Butler, for instance, aided escapees flooding into Fort Monroe in Virginia. Butler had declared these fugitives to be "contraband" – property seized by northern forces – and put them to work, initially without pay, in the fort. Tubman hoped to offer her own expertise and skills to the Union cause, too, and soon she joined a group of Boston and Philadelphia abolitionists heading to the Hilton Head district in South Carolina. She became a fixture in the camps, particularly in Port Royal, South Carolina, assisting fugitives.

Tubman met with General David Hunter, a strong supporter of abolition. He declared all of the "contrabands" in the Port Royal district free, and began gathering formerly slaves for a regiment of black soldiers. U.S. President Abraham Lincoln, however, was not yet prepared to enforce emancipation on the southern states, and reprimanded Hunter for his actions. Tubman condemned Lincoln's response and his general unwillingness to consider ending slavery in the U.S., for both moral and practical reasons:

Tubman served as a nurse in Port Royal, preparing remedies from local plants and aiding soldiers suffering from dysentery. She rendered assistance to men with smallpox; that she did not contract the disease herself started more rumors that she was blessed by God. At first, she received government rations for her work, but newly freed blacks thought she was getting special treatment. To ease the tension, she gave up her right to these supplies and made money selling pies and root beer, which she made in the evenings.

Scouting and the Combahee River Raid 
When Lincoln issued the Emancipation Proclamation, Tubman considered it an important step toward the goal of liberating all black people from slavery. She renewed her support for a defeat of the Confederacy, and in early 1863 she led a band of scouts through the land around Port Royal. The marshes and rivers in South Carolina were similar to those of the Eastern Shore of Maryland; thus, her knowledge of covert travel and subterfuge among potential enemies was put to good use. Her group, working under the orders of Secretary of War Edwin Stanton, mapped the unfamiliar terrain and reconnoitered its inhabitants. She later worked alongside Colonel James Montgomery, and provided him with key intelligence that aided in the capture of Jacksonville, Florida.

Later that year, Tubman became the first woman to lead an armed assault during the Civil War. When Montgomery and his troops conducted an assault on a collection of plantations along the Combahee River, Tubman served as a key adviser and accompanied the raid. On the morning of June 2, 1863, Tubman guided three steamboats around Confederate mines in the waters leading to the shore. Once ashore, the Union troops set fire to the plantations, destroying infrastructure and seizing thousands of dollars worth of food and supplies. When the steamboats sounded their whistles, enslaved people throughout the area understood that they were being liberated. Tubman watched as those fleeing slavery stampeded toward the boats, describing a scene of chaos with women carrying still-steaming pots of rice, pigs squealing in bags slung over shoulders, and babies hanging around their parents' necks, which she punctuated by saying: "I never saw such a sight!" Although those who enslaved them, armed with handguns and whips, tried to stop the mass escape, their efforts were nearly useless in the tumult. As Confederate troops raced to the scene, steamboats packed full of people escaping slavery took off toward Beaufort.

More than 750 enslaved people were rescued in the Combahee River Raid. Newspapers heralded Tubman's "patriotism, sagacity, energy, [and] ability", and she was praised for her recruiting efforts – most of the newly liberated men went on to join the Union army. Tubman later worked with Colonel Robert Gould Shaw at the assault on Fort Wagner, reportedly serving him his last meal. She described the battle:

For two more years, Tubman worked for the Union forces, tending to newly liberated people, scouting into Confederate territory, and nursing wounded soldiers in Virginia. She also made periodic trips back to Auburn to visit her family and care for her parents. The Confederacy surrendered in April 1865; after donating several more months of service, Tubman headed home to Auburn.

During a train ride to New York in 1869, the conductor told her to move from a half-price section into the baggage car. She refused, showing the government-issued papers that entitled her to ride there. He cursed at her and grabbed her, but she resisted and he summoned two other passengers for help. While she clutched at the railing, they muscled her away, breaking her arm in the process. They threw her into the baggage car, causing more injuries. As these events transpired, other white passengers cursed Tubman and shouted for the conductor to kick her off the train. Her act of defiance became a historical symbol, later cited when Rosa Parks refused to move from a bus seat in 1955.

Later life 

Despite her years of service, Tubman never received a regular salary and was for years denied compensation. Her unofficial status and the unequal payments offered to black soldiers caused great difficulty in documenting her service, and the U.S. government was slow in recognizing its debt to her. Her constant humanitarian work for her family and the formerly enslaved, meanwhile, kept her in a state of constant poverty, and her difficulties in obtaining a government pension were especially difficult for her.

Tubman spent her remaining years in Auburn, tending to her family and other people in need. She worked various jobs to support her elderly parents, and took in boarders to help pay the bills. One of the people Tubman took in was a  farmer named Nelson Charles Davis. Born in North Carolina, he had served as a private in the 8th United States Colored Infantry Regiment from September 1863 to November 1865. He began working in Auburn as a bricklayer, and they soon fell in love. Though he was 22 years younger than she was, on March 18, 1869, they were married at the Central Presbyterian Church. They adopted a baby girl named Gertie in 1874, and lived together as a family; Nelson died of tuberculosis on October 14, 1888.

Tubman's friends and supporters from the days of abolition, meanwhile, raised funds to support her. One admirer, Sarah Hopkins Bradford, wrote an authorized biography entitled Scenes in the Life of Harriet Tubman. The 132 page volume was published in 1869 and brought Tubman some $1,200 in income. Criticized by modern biographers for its artistic license and highly subjective point of view, the book nevertheless remains an important source of information and perspective on Tubman's life. In 1886 Bradford released a re-written volume, also intended to help alleviate Tubman's poverty, called Harriet, the Moses of her People. In both volumes Harriet Tubman is hailed as a latter-day Joan of Arc.

Facing accumulated debts (including payments for her property in Auburn), Tubman fell prey in 1873 to a swindle involving gold transfer. Two men, one named Stevenson and the other John Thomas, claimed to have in their possession a cache of gold smuggled out of South Carolina. They offered this treasure – worth about $5,000, they claimed – for $2,000 in cash. They insisted that they knew a relative of Tubman's, and she took them into her home, where they stayed for several days. She knew that white people in the South had buried valuables when Union forces threatened the region, and also that black men were frequently assigned to digging duties. Thus the situation seemed plausible, and a combination of her financial woes and her good nature led her to go along with the plan. She borrowed the money from a wealthy friend named Anthony Shimer and arranged to receive the gold late one night. Once the men had lured her into the woods, however, they attacked her and knocked her out with chloroform, then stole her purse and bound and gagged her. When she was found by her family, she was dazed and injured, and the money was gone.

New York responded with outrage to the incident, and while some criticized Tubman for her naïveté, most sympathized with her economic hardship and lambasted the con men. The incident refreshed the public's memory of her past service and her economic woes. In 1874, Representatives Clinton D. MacDougall of New York and Gerry W. Hazelton of Wisconsin introduced a bill (H.R. 2711/3786) providing that Tubman be paid "the sum of $2,000 for services rendered by her to the Union Army as scout, nurse, and spy". The bill was defeated in the Senate.

The Dependent and Disability Pension Act of 1890 made Tubman eligible for a pension as the widow of Nelson Davis. Although Congress received documents and letters to support Tubman's claims, some members objected to a woman being paid a full soldier's pension. In February 1899, the Congress passed and President William McKinley signed H.R. 4982, which approved a compromise amount of $20 per month (the $8 from her widow's pension plus $12 for her service as a nurse), but did not acknowledge her as a scout and spy. The funds were directed to the maintenance of her relevant historical sites.

Suffragist activism 

In her later years, Tubman worked to promote the cause of women's suffrage. A white woman once asked Tubman whether she believed women ought to have the vote, and received the reply: "I suffered enough to believe it." Tubman began attending meetings of suffragist organizations, and was soon working alongside women such as Susan B. Anthony and Emily Howland.

Tubman traveled to New York, Boston and Washington, D.C. to speak out in favor of women's voting rights. She described her actions during and after the Civil War, and used the sacrifices of countless women throughout modern history as evidence of women's equality to men. When the National Federation of Afro-American Women was founded in 1896, Tubman was the keynote speaker at its first meeting.

This wave of activism kindled a new wave of admiration for Tubman among the press in the United States. A publication called The Woman's Era launched a series of articles on "Eminent Women" with a profile of Tubman. An 1897 suffragist newspaper reported a series of receptions in Boston honoring Tubman and her lifetime of service to the nation. However, her endless contributions to others had left her in poverty, and she had to sell a cow to buy a train ticket to these celebrations.

AME Zion Church, illness, and death 
At the turn of the 20th century, Tubman became heavily involved with the African Methodist Episcopal Zion Church in Auburn. In 1903, she donated a parcel of real estate she owned to the church, under the instruction that it be made into a home for "aged and indigent colored people". The home did not open for another five years, and Tubman was dismayed when the church ordered residents to pay a $100 entrance fee. She said: "[T]hey make a rule that nobody should come in without they have a hundred dollars. Now I wanted to make a rule that nobody should come in unless they didn't have no money at all." She was frustrated by the new rule, but was the guest of honor nonetheless when the Harriet Tubman Home for the Aged celebrated its opening on June 23, 1908.

As Tubman aged, the seizures, headaches, and her childhood head trauma continued to trouble her. At some point in the late 1890s, she underwent brain surgery at Boston's Massachusetts General Hospital. Unable to sleep because of pains and "buzzing" in her head, she asked a doctor if he could operate. He agreed and, in her words, "sawed open my skull, and raised it up, and now it feels more comfortable". She had received no anesthesia for the procedure and reportedly chose instead to bite down on a bullet, as she had seen Civil War soldiers do when their limbs were amputated.

By 1911, Tubman's body was so frail that she was admitted into the rest home named in her honor. A New York newspaper described her as "ill and penniless", prompting supporters to offer a new round of donations. Surrounded by friends and family members, she died of pneumonia on March 10, 1913. Just before she died, she told those in the room: "I go to prepare a place for you." Tubman was buried with semi-military honors at Fort Hill Cemetery in Auburn.

Legacy 

Widely known and well-respected while she was alive, Tubman became an American icon in the years after she died. A survey at the end of the 20th century named her as one of the most famous civilians in American history before the Civil War, third only to Betsy Ross and Paul Revere. She inspired generations of African Americans struggling for equality and civil rights; she was praised by leaders across the political spectrum. The city of Auburn commemorated her life with a plaque on the courthouse. Although it showed pride for her many achievements, its use of dialect ("I nebber run my train off de track"), apparently chosen for its authenticity, has been criticized for undermining her stature as an American patriot and dedicated humanitarian. Nevertheless, the dedication ceremony was a powerful tribute to her memory, and Booker T. Washington delivered the keynote address.

Museums and historical sites
In 1937, a gravestone for Harriet Tubman was erected by the Empire State Federation of Women's Clubs; it was listed on the National Register of Historic Places in 1999. The Harriet Tubman Home was abandoned after 1920, but was later renovated by the AME Zion Church and opened as a museum and education center. A Harriet Tubman Memorial Library was opened nearby in 1979.

The Salem Chapel in St. Catharines, Ontario is a special place for Black Canadians. Tubman worshipped there while living in the town. The building was erected in 1855 by some of those who had escaped slavery in the United States. It was designated a National Historic Site in 1999, on the recommendation of the Historic Sites and Monuments Board of Canada. Renovations are in progress and should be completed in 2023, guided by some descendants of those who found freedom in British territory. However, Tubman’s descendants live in British Columbia.

Tubman herself was designated a National Historic Person after the Historic Sites and Monuments Board recommended it in 2005.

As early as 2008, advocacy groups in Maryland and New York, and their federal representatives, pushed for legislation to establish two national historical parks honoring Harriet Tubman: One to include her place of birth on Maryland's eastern shore, and sites along the route of the Underground Railroad in Caroline, Dorchester, and Talbot counties in Maryland; and a second to include her home in Auburn, New York. For the next six years, bills to do so were introduced, but were never enacted. In 2013, President Barack Obama used his executive authority to create the Harriet Tubman Underground Railroad National Monument, consisting of federal lands on Maryland's Eastern Shore at Blackwater National Wildlife Refuge.

In December 2014, authorization for a national historical park designation was incorporated in the 2015 National Defense Authorization Act. Despite opposition from some legislators, the bill passed with bipartisan support and was signed into law by President Obama on December 19, 2014. The Harriet Tubman National Historical Park in Auburn, authorized by the act, was established on January 10, 2017. In March 2017 the Harriet Tubman Underground Railroad Visitor Center was inaugurated in Maryland within Harriet Tubman Underground Railroad State Park. The act also created the Harriet Tubman Underground Railroad National Historical Park in Maryland within the authorized boundary of the national monument, while permitting later additional acquisitions. The Harriet Tubman Museum opened in Cape May, New Jersey in 2020.

The National Museum of African American History and Culture has items owned by Tubman, including eating utensils, a hymnal, and a linen and silk shawl given to her by Queen Victoria of the United Kingdom. Related items include a photographic portrait of Tubman (one of only a few known to exist), and three postcards with images of Tubman's 1913 funeral.

The theme is "Leaders, Friendship, Diversity, Freedom" and "By the people, for the people." The statue was sculpted and cast by Dexter Benedict, and unveiled on May 17, 2019.

In 2023, a 25-foot monument honoring Tubman, called "Shadow of a Face", was unveiled in Harriet Tubman Square. The monument was designed by Nina Cooke John, and features an audio installation of Tubman's life narrated by Queen Latifah. It is a replacement for a Christopher Columbus statue removed in June 2020.

Twenty-dollar bill 
On April 20, 2016, then-U.S. Treasury Secretary Jack Lew announced plans to add a portrait of Tubman to the front of the twenty-dollar bill, moving the portrait of President Andrew Jackson, himself an enslaver and trafficker of human beings, to the rear of the bill. Lew instructed the Bureau of Engraving and Printing to expedite the redesign process, and the new bill was expected to enter circulation sometime after 2020. However, in 2017 U.S. Treasury Secretary Steven Mnuchin said that he would not commit to putting Tubman on the twenty dollar bill, saying, "People have been on the bills for a long period of time. This is something we'll consider; right now we have a lot more important issues to focus on." In 2021, under the Biden administration, the Treasury Department resumed the effort to add Tubman's portrait to the front of the $20 bill and hoped to expedite the process.

Artistic portrayals

Tubman is the subject of works of art including songs, novels, sculptures, paintings, movies, and theatrical productions. Musicians have celebrated her in works such as "The Ballad of Harriet Tubman" by Woody Guthrie, the song "Harriet Tubman" by Walter Robinson, and the instrumental "Harriet Tubman" by Wynton Marsalis.

Theater and opera
There have been several operas based on Tubman's life, including Thea Musgrave's Harriet, the Woman Called Moses, which premiered in 1985 at the Virginia Opera. Nkeiru Okoye also wrote the opera Harriet Tubman: When I Crossed that Line to Freedom first performed in 2014. In 2018 the world premier of the opera Harriet by Hilda Paredes was given by Muziektheater Transparant in Huddersfield, UK. The libretto came from poetry by Mayra Santos-Febres and dialogue from Lex Bohlmeijer Stage plays based on Tubman's life appeared as early as the 1930s, when May Miller and Willis Richardson included a play about Tubman in their 1934 collection Negro History in Thirteen Plays. Other plays about Tubman include Harriet's Return by Karen Jones Meadows and Harriet Tubman Visits a Therapist by Carolyn Gage.

Literature
In printed fiction, in 1948 Tubman was the subject of Anne Parrish's A Clouded Star, a  biographical novel that was criticized for presenting negative stereotypes of African-Americans. A Woman Called Moses, a 1976 novel by Marcy Heidish, was criticized for portraying a drinking, swearing, sexually active version of Tubman. Tubman biographer James A. McGowan called the novel a "deliberate distortion". The 2019 novel The Tubman Command by Elizabeth Cobbs focuses on Tubman's leadership of the Combahee River Raid. Tubman also appears as a character in other novels, such as Terry Bisson's 1988 science fiction novel Fire on the Mountain, James McBride's 2013 novel The Good Lord Bird, and the 2019 novel The Water Dancer by Ta-Nehisi Coates.

Film and television
Tubman's life was dramatized on television in 1963 on the CBS series The Great Adventure in an episode titled "Go Down Moses" with Ruby Dee starring as Tubman. In December 1978, Cicely Tyson portrayed her for the NBC miniseries A Woman Called Moses, based on the novel by Heidish. In 1994, Alfre Woodard played Tubman in the television film Race to Freedom: The Underground Railroad. In 2017, Aisha Hinds portrayed Tubman in the second season of the WGN America drama series Underground. In 2018, Christine Horn portrayed her in an episode of the science fiction series Timeless, which covers her role in the Civil War. Harriet, a biographical film starring Cynthia Erivo in the title role, premiered at the Toronto International Film Festival in September 2019. The production received good reviews, and Academy Award nominations for Best Actress and Best Song. The film became "one of the most successful biographical dramas in the history of Focus Features" and made $43 million against a production budget of $17 million.

Monuments and memorials
Sculptures of Tubman have been placed in several American cities. A 1993 Underground Railroad memorial fashioned by Ed Dwight in Battle Creek, Michigan features Tubman leading a group of people from slavery to freedom. In 1995, sculptor Jane DeDecker created a statue of Tubman leading a child, which was placed in Mesa, Arizona. Copies of DeDecker's statue were subsequently installed in several other cities, including one at Brenau University in Gainesville, Georgia. It was the first statue honoring Tubman at an institution in the Old South. The city of Boston commissioned Step on Board, a  bronze sculpture by artist Fern Cunningham placed at the entrance to Harriet Tubman Park in 1999. It was the first memorial to a woman on city-owned land. Swing Low, a  statue of Tubman by Alison Saar, was erected in Manhattan in 2008. In 2009, Salisbury University in Salisbury, Maryland unveiled a statue created by James Hill, an arts professor at the university. It was the first sculpture of Tubman placed in the region where she was born. In 2022, a statue of Tubman was installed at CIA headquarters in Langley, Virginia, joining statues of Revolutionary War spy Nathan Hale and CIA founding father William J. Donovan.

Visual arts

Visual artists have depicted Tubman as an inspirational figure. In 1931, painter Aaron Douglas completed Spirits Rising, a mural of Tubman at the Bennett College for Women in Greensboro, North Carolina. Douglas said he wanted to portray Tubman "as a heroic leader" who would "idealize a superior type of Negro womanhood". A series of paintings about Tubman's life by Jacob Lawrence appeared at the Museum of Modern Art in New York in 1940. He called Tubman's life "one of the great American sagas". On February 1, 1978, the United States Postal Service issued a 13-cent stamp in honor of Tubman, designed by artist Jerry Pinkney. She was the first African-American woman to be honored on a U.S. postage stamp. A second, 32-cent stamp featuring Tubman was issued on June 29, 1995. In 2019, artist Michael Rosato depicted Tubman in a mural along U.S. Route 50, near Cambridge, Maryland, and in another mural in Cambridge on the side of the Harriet Tubman Museum.

Other honors and commemorations
Tubman is commemorated together with Elizabeth Cady Stanton, Amelia Bloomer, and Sojourner Truth in the calendar of saints of the Episcopal Church on July 20. The calendar of saints of the Evangelical Lutheran Church in America remembers Tubman and Sojourner Truth on March 10. Since 2003, the state of New York has also commemorated Tubman on March 10, although the day is not a legal holiday.

Numerous structures, organizations, and other entities have been named in Tubman's honor. These include dozens of schools, streets and highways in several states, and various church groups, social organizations, and government agencies. An asteroid, (241528) Tubman, was named after her in 2014. A section of the Wyman Park Dell in Baltimore, Maryland was renamed Harriet Tubman Grove in March 2018; the grove was previously the site of a double equestrian statue of Confederate generals Robert E. Lee and Stonewall Jackson, which was among four statues removed from public areas around Baltimore in August 2017. In 2021, a park in Milwaukee was renamed from Wahl Park to Harriet Tubman Park.

Tubman was posthumously inducted into the National Women's Hall of Fame in 1973, the Maryland Women's Hall of Fame in 1985, and the Military Intelligence Hall of Fame in 2019.

In a ceremony on Juneteenth 2022, Washington Park in Newark, New Jersey was re-named to Harriet Tubman Square.

The Lapidus Center for the Historical Analysis of Transatlantic Slavery awards the annual Harriet Tubman Prize for "the best nonfiction book published in the United States on the slave trade, slavery, and anti-slavery in the Atlantic World".

Historiography 
The first modern biography of Tubman to be published after Sarah Hopkins Bradford's 1869 and 1886 books was Earl Conrad's Harriet Tubman (1943). Conrad had experienced great difficulty in finding a publisher – the search took four years – and endured disdain and contempt for his efforts to construct a more objective, detailed account of Tubman's life for adults. Several highly dramatized versions of Tubman's life had been written for children, and many more came later, but Conrad wrote in an academic style to document the historical importance of her work for scholars and the nation's collective memory. The book was finally published by Carter G. Woodson's Associated Publishers in 1943. Though she was a popular significant historical figure, another Tubman biography for adults did not appear for 60 years, when Jean Humez published a close reading of Tubman's life stories in 2003. Larson and Clinton both published their biographies soon after in 2004. Author Milton C. Sernett discusses all the major biographies of Tubman in his 2007 book Harriet Tubman: Myth, Memory, and History.

See also 

 Frederick Douglass
 Ida B. Wells
 List of slaves
 List of suffragists and suffragettes
 Richard Amos Ball
 Tilly Escape

References

Sources

Further reading

External links 

 
 Harriet Tubman: Online Resources, from the Library of Congress
 Full text of Scenes in the Life of Harriet Tubman, from the University of North Carolina at Chapel Hill
 
 Harriet Tubman Biography Page from Kate Larson
 Harriet Tubman Web Quest: Leading the Way to Freedom – Scholastic.com
 The Tubman Museum of African American History
 Harriet Tubman National Historical Park
 Harriet Tubman Underground Railroad National Historical Park
 Harriet Tubman: Visions of Freedom a co-production of Firelight Films and Maryland Public Television (released October 4, 2022)
 Michals, Debra. "Harriet Tubman". National Women's History Museum. 2015.
 Maurer, Elizabeth L. "Harriet Tubman". National Women's History Museum. 2016.
 "Railway to Freedom" radio presentation, from Destination Freedom
 "Harriets Children", from Destination Freedom 

 
1822 births
1913 deaths
African-American abolitionists
American people with disabilities
American rebel slaves
Fugitive American slaves
Underground Railroad people
History of slavery in Maryland
History of Maryland
African-American history of Maryland
African Americans in the American Civil War
African-American female military personnel
Women in the American Civil War
American Civil War spies
Female wartime spies
People of Maryland in the American Civil War
African-American activists
American women's rights activists
African-American feminists
19th-century African-American people
Activists from Maryland
African-American nurses
American women nurses
Persons of National Historic Significance (Canada)
African-American Methodists
19th-century Methodists
20th-century Methodists
20th-century Christian saints
American saints
Anglican saints
Christian female saints of the Late Modern era
New Jersey Hall of Fame inductees
People celebrated in the Lutheran liturgical calendar
Proponents of Christian feminism
People with epilepsy
People from Auburn, New York
People from Cayuga County, New York
People from Dorchester County, Maryland
People from Port Royal, South Carolina
American people of Ashanti descent
American people of Ghanaian descent
Deaths from pneumonia in New York (state)
19th-century African-American women
20th-century African-American women
20th-century African-American people
Methodist abolitionists
Women mystics
American Christian mystics